Manuel Zeceña Diéguez (1918-1991) was a Guatemalan film producer, director and writer. The majority of his films were made in Mexico and he worked with prominent Mexican actors and filmmakers.

Career

1950s–1960s
As a writer he wrote the script for the 1954 comedy film  which was directed by René Cardona. He produced the film  which was released in 1954. For the film  starring Jorge Mistral, Teresa Velázquez and Martha Elena Cervantes, he was both writer and producer. It was released around 1962. He was asked to produce the film  which was a joint Mexican/Guatemalan production, released in 1963. It was directed by Emilio Fernandez with cinematography by Raúl Martínez Solares, and starred Patricia Conde, Emilio Fernandez and Andrés Soler. The film, which was released in 1968, featured Leonorilda Ochoa, Eric del Castillo and Norma Mora.

1970s
He directed the 1970 film  which starred Julio Alemán, Tere Velázquez and Amadee Chabot. His last film in the 1970s seems to be The Hughes Mystery which starred Jackson Bostwick, Broderick Crawford, José Ferrer, Hope Holiday, Guy Madison and Cameron Mitchell. The production company was S.A. Filmadora Panamericana. It was finished by 1979 and released that year. According to the book The Complete Films of Broderick Crawford by Ralph Schiller, there seems to be a mystery as to what happened to the film; it was never released in the United States and nobody seems to have seen it. There was an indication that it was sold in Australia. After that film Zeceña Diéguez appears to have stopped working.

Death
Zeceña Diéguez died in Guatemala on June 9, 1991, aged 73.

Filmography

References

External links
 
 Letterboxd: Manuel Zeceña Diéguez

1918 births
1991 deaths
Guatemalan film directors
Guatemalan film producers
Guatemalan male writers
Guatemalan screenwriters
Male screenwriters
20th-century screenwriters